The 1987–88 AHL season was the 52nd season of the American Hockey League. Fourteen teams played 80 games each in the schedule. The league abandoned shootout, but continues to award points for an overtime loss. The Hershey Bears finished first overall in the regular season, and won their seventh Calder Cup championship.

Team changes
 The original Maine Mariners become the Utica Devils based in Utica, New York, playing in the South Division.
 A new Maine Mariners join the AHL as an expansion team.
 The Moncton Golden Flames become the Moncton Hawks.
 The New Haven Nighthawks & Springfield Indians switch divisions from South to North.
 The Adirondack Red Wings switch divisions from North to South.

Final standings
Note: GP = Games played; W = Wins; L = Losses; T = Ties; OTL = Overtime losses; GF = Goals for; GA = Goals against; Pts = Points;

Scoring leadersNote: GP = Games played; G = Goals; A = Assists; Pts = Points; PIM = Penalty minutes''

 complete list

Calder Cup playoffs

Trophy and award winners
Team awards

Individual awards

Other awards

See also
List of AHL seasons

References
AHL official site
AHL Hall of Fame
HockeyDB

 
American Hockey League seasons
2
2